Lake Alma is a special service area within the Rural Municipality of Lake Alma No. 8, Saskatchewan, Canada that held village status prior to August 2018. The community shares its name with the nearby Alma Lake and surrounding rural municipality. Lake Alma had a population of 30 in the 2016, 2011 and 2006 Censuses).

History 
Lake Alma incorporated as a village on January 1, 1949. It restructured on July 31, 2018, relinquishing its village status in favour of becoming a special service area under the jurisdiction of the Rural Municipality of Lake Alma No. 8.

Demographics

See also 
List of communities in Saskatchewan
List of special service areas in Saskatchewan

References 

Lake Alma No. 8, Saskatchewan
Special service areas in Saskatchewan
Former villages in Saskatchewan
Populated places disestablished in 2018
Division No. 2, Saskatchewan